Kuldeep Joshi, an ex-student of Jagadguru Rambhadracharya Handicapped University, is the first visually-imapaired student in India to play tabla continuously for 12 hours.

Personal life
Kuldeep Joshi is a native of the Dungarpur district of the  Rajasthan state of India. He lost his eyesight at the age of eight. His father, Manshankar Joshi, is a physical education teacher and his mother, Sharada Devi, is a housewife.

He has two brothers. As of  2012, his elder brother was working in Mumbai and his younger brother was pursuing the Chartered Accountant course in Pune.

References

Blind musicians
Living people
Indian male musicians
Tabla players
People from Dungarpur district
Year of birth missing (living people)